Highway 379 is a highway in the Canadian province of Saskatchewan. It runs from Highway 4 near Wymark to Township Road 132 near McMahon and South Gnadenthal.

Highway 379 also passes near the communities of Hak, Schoenfeld, Schoenwiese, Chortitz, and Rheinfeld. Highway 379 also connects with Highway 721.

References

379